Mary O'Neill is a Canadian politician.

Mary O'Neill may also refer to:

Mary Devenport O'Neill, American poet
Mary O'Neill (fencer), American Olympic fencer
Mary-Anne O'Neill, Australian politician

See also
Mary O'Neal (disambiguation)
O'Neill (surname)